Street Lane is a hamlet in the Amber Valley district of Derbyshire, England.

It is in close proximity to the nearby town of Ripley.

Street Lane is a linear hamlet, dominated by the eponymous road, which roughly descends from the north near Upper Hartshay to the south at Denby.

Hamlets in Derbyshire
Amber Valley